The Renewables Obligation (RO) is designed to encourage generation of electricity from eligible renewable sources in the United Kingdom. It was introduced in England and Wales and in a different form (the Renewables Obligation (Scotland)) in Scotland in April 2002 and in Northern Ireland in April 2005, replacing the Non-Fossil Fuel Obligation which operated from 1990.

The RO places an obligation on licensed electricity suppliers in the United Kingdom to source an increasing proportion of electricity from renewable sources, similar to a renewable portfolio standard. In 2010/11 it is 11.1% (4.0% in Northern Ireland). This figure was initially set at 3% for the period 2002/03 and under current political commitments will rise to 15.4% (6.3% in Northern Ireland) by the period 2015/16 and then it runs until 2037 (2033 in Northern Ireland). The extension of the scheme from 2027 to 2037 was declared on 1 April 2010 and is detailed in the National Renewable Energy Action Plan. Since its introduction the RO has more than tripled the level of eligible renewable electricity generation (from 1.8% of total UK supply to 7.0% in 2010).

The Renewable Obligation scheme
Suppliers meet their obligations by presenting Renewable Obligation Certificates (ROCs) to Ofgem. Where suppliers do not have sufficient ROCs to cover their obligation, a payment is made into the buy-out fund. The buy-out price suppliers pay is a fixed price per MWh shortfall and is adjusted in line with the Retail Prices Index each year. The proceeds of the buy-out fund are paid back to suppliers in proportion to how many ROCs they have presented. For example, if they were to submit 5% of the total number of ROCs submitted they would receive 5% of the total funds that defaulting supply companies pay into the buy-out fund.

ROCs are intended to create a market, and be traded at market prices that differ from the official buy-out price. If there is an excess of renewable production, beyond the supplier obligation, the price of ROCs would fall below the buy-out price. The price of ROCs could approach zero if renewable and non-renewable generation costs became similar, when there would be little or no subsidy of renewable generation. If there is less renewable production than the obligation, the price of ROCs would increase above the buy-out price, as purchasers anticipate later payments from the buy-out fund on each ROC.

Obligation periods run for one year, beginning on 1 April and running to 31 March. Supply companies have until the 31 August following the period to submit sufficient ROCs to cover their obligation, or to submit sufficient payment to the buy-out fund to cover the shortfall.

The cost of ROCs is effectively paid by electricity consumers of supply companies that fail to present sufficient ROCs, whilst reducing the cost to consumers of supply companies who submit large numbers of ROCs, assuming that all costs and savings are passed on to consumers.

Percentages and prices by year 

Sources:

Certificates 

A ROC is the green certificate issued for eligible renewable electricity generated within the United Kingdom and supplied to customers in the United Kingdom by a licensed supplier. ROCs are issued by Ofgem to accredited renewable generators (or in the case of generating stations subject to a NFFO (non-fossil fuels obligation), Scottish Renewables Obligation or Northern Ireland NFFO contract, to the nominated electricity supplier). It is worth noting that the Scottish Renewables Obligation was superseded by the Renewables Obligation (Scotland) in 2002.

The default is that one ROC is issued for each megawatt-hour (MWh) of eligible renewable output. Some technologies get more, some less. For instance, offshore wind installations receive 2 ROCs per MWh; onshore wind installations receive 0.9 ROCs per MWh and sewage gas-fired plants receive half a ROC per MWh.

ROCs are issued into the ROC Register and so are electronic certificates. Normally, a renewable generator will transfer the related ROCs through Ofgem's electronic registry when it sells power to an electricity supplier.

The legislation 

The Utilities Act 2000 gives the Secretary of State the power to require electricity suppliers to supply a certain proportion of their total sales in the United Kingdom from electricity generated from renewable sources. A Renewables Obligation Order is issued annually detailing the precise level of the obligation for the coming year-long period of obligation and the level of the buy-out price. The Renewables Obligation (England and Wales) was introduced by the Department of Trade and Industry, the Renewables Obligation (Scotland) was introduced by the Scottish Executives and the Northern Ireland Renewables Obligation was introduced by the Department of Enterprise Trade and Investment (DETINI). The Orders were subject to review in 2005/06 and new Orders came into effect on 1 April 2006. The relevant pieces of legislation for the period April 2006 – March 2007 are:

The Renewables Obligation Order 2006 (Statutory Instrument (SI) 2006 No. 1004)
The Renewables Obligation (Scotland) Order 2006 (SI 2006 No. 173), and
The Renewables Obligation Order (Northern Ireland) 2006 (SI 2006 No. 56).

All pieces of legislation are published on the National Archives legislation site.

Ofgem's role 

Ofgem is the Office of Gas and Electricity Markets in Great Britain. The Orders detail Ofgem's powers and functions to administer the Renewables Obligation. These functions include:

Accrediting generating stations as being capable of generating electricity from eligible renewable sources
Issuing ROCs and revoking these as necessary
Establishing and maintaining a Register of ROCs
Monitoring compliance with the requirements of the Orders
Calculating annually the buy-out price
Receiving buy-out payments and redistributing the buy-out fund
Receiving late payments and redistributing the late payment fund, and
Publishing an annual report on the operation of and compliance with the requirements of the Orders.

Ofgem also administers the Northern Ireland Renewables Obligation (NIRO) on behalf of the Northern Ireland Authority for Energy Regulation (NIAER).

Types of energy eligible
The following sources of electricity are eligible for ROCs:

Biogas from anaerobic digestion
Biomass
Combined Heat and Power (CHP)
Hydro electric
Tidal power
Wind power
Photovoltaic cells
Landfill gas
Sewage gas
Wave power

Co-firing of biomass is also eligible. Not all technologies which are eligible will actually be supported due to cost. Some renewable sources of electricity are not eligible for ROCs (e.g. larger hydroelectric schemes which were in operation before April 2002).

Government review

The obligation was reviewed by government following a consultation period that finished in September 2007. The document at the centre of the consultation set out an amended form of the RO which will see different technologies earn different numbers of ROCs. This has not yet been adopted as policy.

On 22 January 2007, Ofgem called for the Renewables Obligation to be replaced, claiming that the scheme is a 'very costly way' of supporting renewable electricity generation. In particular they are concerned that electricity customers pay for renewables projects even if they are not built due to problems obtaining planning permission, and the failure of the Renewables Obligation to link financial support for renewables to either the electricity price or the price of renewables in the European Union Emissions Trading Scheme.

The British Wind Energy Association, whose members are major beneficiaries of the existing scheme, claims that Ofgem is partly responsible for the costs because it has failed to prioritise work on the National Grid which would allow more renewable capacity to be connected. They also stressed the need to maintain stability in the marketplace to maintain the confidence of investors.

The concerns of both bodies seem to be shared by the Renewable Energy Association.

The Scottish Wind Assessment Project has criticised the scheme for rewarding reductions in renewable electricity output: two electricity suppliers, Scottish and Southern Energy and Npower, down-rated several large hydro-power stations in order to qualify for Renewables Obligation Certificates.

Banding 

The Renewables Obligation represents the UK Government's main policy measure for stimulating the growth of electricity generation from renewable sources. The Government envisages that 30% of electricity demand will need to be generated by renewable sources in order for the UK to meet a legally binding EU target of obtaining 15% of energy from renewable sources by 2020.

The Renewables Obligation is a market-based mechanism designed to incentivise the generation of electricity from renewable energy sources over more traditional alternatives at a reasonable cost.

When it was first introduced in 2002, each form of renewable energy technology received the same level of support, namely one ROC/MWh of electricity generated. This was a conscious decision as the Government was keen to promote a market-led approach, emphasising competition between technologies to minimise cost, and did not want to distort the market by appearing to place the importance of certain technologies above others.

As a result, whilst being ostensibly technology-neutral, the Renewables Obligation in its original form in fact favoured the deployment of the more established, near-market technologies such as landfill gas and onshore wind, those which were most economically efficient, over less well developed technologies that were further from commercial viability.

A review of the performance of the Renewables Obligation was announced in 2003. Modelling of future deployment scenarios indicated that targets would not be met with current levels of support due to constraints on the availability and deployment of the most established technologies. A significant contribution would therefore be required from less mature technologies which lacked sufficient incentive to develop into feasible alternatives under the original scheme.

The Government announced its intention to reform the Renewables Obligation in 2006. Banding was introduced in 2009 to provide differing levels of support to groups of technologies depending upon their relative maturity, development cost and associated risk. Whilst increasing the incentive for technologies in the early stages of development this also allowed the level of support for well established technologies to be reduced to avoid over-subsidisation.

In reforming the Renewables Obligation in this way, and scheduling regular future reviews, the Government recognised that the market would not deliver the mix of renewable energy generation required to meet the targets if the incentives remained technology-neutral. It was therefore necessary for the Government to perform a continuing strategic role and retain the capability to intervene if necessary. The introduction of banding allowed the Government to steer industry towards investment in less well developed forms of renewable energy to enable them to contribute to meeting the long-term targets, rather than concentrating investment in technologies that are economically favourable in the short-term.

The Government has reviewed the banding levels for appropriate incentives for the period 2013–2017. These bands include a reduction in the tariff for onshore wind to 0.9 ROCs/MWh and an increase for small wave and tidal stream projects, under 30 MW, to 5 ROCs/MWh.

Electricity market reform and future 

The UK Government has proposed wide-ranging reforms to the UK electricity market which will eventually see feed-in tariffs with contracts for difference (CfD) replace the Renewables Obligation as the main renewable generation support mechanism. Unlike ROCs, CfDs will also be available to generators of nuclear electricity.

Other than with respect to large scale (>5MW) solar photovoltaic power projects and onshore wind power projects, the Renewables Obligation will remain open to new generation until 31 March 2017, allowing new renewable generation that comes online between 2014 (when it is anticipated the CfDs will start) and 2017 to choose between CfDs and ROCs. After that date, the government intends to close the Renewables Obligation to new generation and ‘vintage’ existing ROCs, meaning that levels and length of support for existing participants in the Renewables Obligation will be maintained.

However, the government subsequently announced that it would bring forward the deadline for Renewables Obligation accreditation for large scale (>5MW) solar photovoltaic power projects, to 1 April 2015.  The government further announced on 18 June 2015 that it intended to close the Renewables Obligation to new onshore wind power projects on 1 April 2016 (bringing the deadline forward by one year).

In addition to the introduction of feed-in tariffs, the UK Government's proposed electricity market reform included two further initiatives to encourage the decarbonisation of electricity generation: a Carbon Price Floor and an Emissions Performance Standard.

See also

Electricity billing in the UK
Future Energy (former green electricity accreditation scheme)
Green electricity
Green tags
Non-Fossil Fuel Obligation
Renewable Energy Certificates (United States) – a similar mechanism in the US
United Kingdom Climate Change Programme

References

External links
Calculating Renewable Obligation Certificates (ROCs) – banding, Department of Energy & Climate Change, April 2013
 8 January 2007, New Builder: BWEA warns on UK renewables policy as Germany leads the way
 9 October 2006, ePolitix.com: Granting of renewables obligation certificates to be reformed
 9 August 2006, Guardian Unlimited: Tickell, O: Treasury takes £150m out of renewable energy fund

Renewable energy in the United Kingdom
Environment of the United Kingdom
Waste legislation in the United Kingdom